A velar fricative is a fricative consonant produced at the velar place of articulation. It is possible to distinguish the following kinds of velar fricatives:

Fricative consonants
Velar consonants